The Republic of China Air Force Museum is an air force open-air museum in Gangshan District, Kaohsiung, Taiwan.

History
The museum building was completed on 14 August 1987 to accommodate the Republic of China Air Force Academy campus planning.

Exhibitions
The overall exhibition area of the museum spans over an area of 3 hectares, which consists of various collections of artifacts, archives, weapons and airplanes.

See also
 List of museums in Taiwan
 Republic of China Air Force
 Republic of China Air Force Academy
 Republic of China Armed Forces Museum
 List of aircraft used in China before 1937

References

External links

 Republic of China Air Force Museum 空軍軍史官 , Taiwan, 2007.

1987 establishments in Taiwan
Air force museums
Military and war museums in Taiwan
Museums established in 1987
Museums in Kaohsiung
Open-air museums in Taiwan
Museum